The Cannone da 152/50 or 152/50 A. Mod. 1918 was a heavy naval gun, designed in the United Kingdom and produced under licence in Italy. It was used as coastal artillery during the Second World War.

It was originally produced from 1918 onwards by Gio. Ansaldo & C. under licence from Armstrong Whitworth, as indicated by the "A" in its name. It was installed in Regia Marina forts and used by the Milizia Marittima di Artiglieria (MILMART) who manned the batteries.

Specifications

Cupola mounting

Pedestal mounting

Bibliography
  Le armi e le artiglierie in servizio di F. Grandi, Ed. fuori commercio, 1938.

References

World War II artillery of Italy
Naval guns of Italy
Gio. Ansaldo & C. artillery